Ringo Lo Moon Tong (born 12 March 1964) is a Hong Kong fencer. He competed in the individual foil event at the 1992 Summer Olympics.

References

External links
 

1964 births
Living people
Hong Kong male foil fencers
Olympic fencers of Hong Kong
Fencers at the 1992 Summer Olympics
Asian Games medalists in fencing
Fencers at the 1990 Asian Games
Fencers at the 1994 Asian Games
Fencers at the 1998 Asian Games
Asian Games bronze medalists for Hong Kong
Medalists at the 1990 Asian Games
20th-century Hong Kong people